The Gailberg Saddle (el. 981 m.) is a high mountain pass in the Austrian Alps in the Bundesland of Kärnten (or Carinthia).

It connects Oberdrauburg in the north with Kötschach-Mauthen in the south. It leads to the Dolomites in the south.

See also
 List of highest paved roads in Europe
 List of mountain passes

Mountain passes of the Alps
Mountain passes of Carinthia (state)
Gailtal Alps